Alberto Palloni (born April 29, 1949) is an Italian-American demographer and sociologist who works for the RAND Corporation. He was previously the Samuel H. Preston Professor of Sociology, and the E.T. Young Professor of Population and International Studies, at the University of Wisconsin-Madison. In 2006, he was the president of the Population Association of America.

Biography
Palloni was born in Chile to Italian parents. He was educated at the Catholic University of Chile (B.S./B.A. in sociology, 1971) and the University of Washington (Ph.D. in sociology, 1977).

Work
Palloni is known for his demographic research on health, morbidity, and mortality. For example, he and John L. Hagan published a study in 2006 estimating that the death toll from the war in Darfur was much higher than estimated by the United States government. He has also researched the disparity in life expectancy between American Hispanics and whites.

References

External links
Biography at RAND Corporation website
University of Wisconsin-Madison Faculty page

Living people
American demographers
American sociologists
1949 births
University of Wisconsin–Madison faculty
Chilean emigrants to the United States
University of Washington College of Arts and Sciences alumni
Pontifical Catholic University of Chile alumni
Center for Advanced Study in the Behavioral Sciences fellows